Leonardo Genoni (born 28 August 1987) is a Swiss professional ice hockey goaltender who is currently playing for EV Zug of the National League (NL).

Playing career
Genoni made his professional debut with the GCK Lions in the Swiss League as a prospect to the ZSC Lions during the 2004–05 season. He went on to play 3 seasons in the organization before moving to HC Davos for the 2007–08 season. Genoni played 9 seasons for Davos becoming one of the best goaltender in the National League.

On 1 October 2015 Genoni signed a three-year contract with SC Bern worth CHF 1.8 million for the 2016/17 season and through the 2018–19 season.

On 6 August 2018 Genoni signed a five-year contract worth CHF 5 million with EV Zug for the 2019–20 season and through the 2023–24 season.

International play

As a junior player, Genoni competed at the 2005 IIHF World U18 Championships and at the IIHF World U20 Championship.  He participated at multiple Ice Hockey World Championships (e.g. 2011 and 2018) as a member of the Switzerland men's national ice hockey team.

At the 2018 IIHF World Championship, he won a silver medal after advancing to the final but Switzerland fell to Sweden in the shootout.

Career statistics

International

Awards and honours

References

External links

1987 births
SC Bern players
HC Davos players
GCK Lions players
Living people
Swiss ice hockey goaltenders
ZSC Lions players
Ice hockey players at the 2018 Winter Olympics
Ice hockey players at the 2022 Winter Olympics
Olympic ice hockey players of Switzerland
Sportspeople from Ticino